Dəlləklər (also, Dellyaklyar and Delleklyar) is a village in the Yevlakh Rayon of Azerbaijan. The village forms part of the municipality of Qaramanlı.

References 

Populated places in Yevlakh District